Wood End School is an elementary school (grades K-5) in Reading, Massachusetts, United States. The school is located at 85 Sunset Rock Lane.  There are 343 students in grades K-5 and 60 staff members.  Dr. Joanne King is the principal. The school was recognized in 2008 as a “Beacon of Light” school by the Blue Ribbon School of Excellence Program.

References

Public elementary schools in Massachusetts
Buildings and structures in Reading, Massachusetts
Schools in Middlesex County, Massachusetts